Moussa Sow (born 19 January 1986) is a professional footballer who plays as a forward. Born in France, he represented Senegal at international level, scoring 18 goals in 50 appearances. He was known for his bicycle kick goals and emotional reactions such as crying when he failed to score, or when the team has lost.

He started his professional career at Stade Rennais in 2004 as an 18-year-old. In his first couple of seasons, Sow made his mark mostly in cup competitions, scoring a brace for Rennes against Corte on 6 January 2006 in the Coupe de France and one in an away game against Lille in the Coupe de la Ligue. He was loaned out to Sedan in 2007, scoring six goals in 30 appearances for the club. Upon his return to Rennes, he was the club's first-choice striker for two seasons before joining Lille on a free transfer In June 2010, where he made an immediate impact. He finished the 2010–11 Ligue 1 as the league's top scorer with 25 goals and made the Team of the Year. He joined Fenerbahçe in 2012. At Fenerbahçe, he was known for his bicycle kick goals and emotional reactions such as crying when he failed to score, or when the team has lost.

Club career

Lille

After his contract with Rennes came to an end, the 24-year–old forward signed a three-year deal with Lille OSC on 28 June 2010. Sow scored on his debut for Lille in a 1–1 draw away to his former club Rennes. But Moussa Sow did not score again in the league until a 90th-minute goal on 19 September gave Lille all three points in a tough home contest against Auxerre.

Sow scored his first hat-trick for Lille on 13 November 2010, the goals came in a 5–2 away victory to Caen, with both Gervinho and Franck Beria grabbing 90th-minute goals to seal the win. Less than a month later on 5 December 2010, Sow netted another hat-trick this time against Lorient. His goals helped Lille to a 6–3 win and firmly placed his side into contention for the Ligue 1 crown. Lille went into the winter break in sole position of first place, as Sow fired in their only goal in a 1–1 draw with Saint Étienne on 22 December 2010.

Sow scored his 22nd goal of the Ligue 1 campaign in a 2–2 draw with Paris Saint-Germain on 21 May 2011. The result ensured that Lille would secure their first Ligue 1 title since 1954. Sow scored his third hat-trick, on the final day of the season, as Lille tied the knot on their championship season with an emphatic 3–2 victory over former club Rennes. Sow was the top scorer 2010–11 season with 25 league goals and also contributed with three assists.

Fenerbahçe

On 27 January 2012, Fenerbahçe acquired Sow for €10 million. He signed a 4.5-year contract which would have kept him at the club until the end of 2015–16 season. Sow made his debut against local rivals Beşiktaş on 5 February 2012, scoring a goal in the second minute of injury time. On 18 March he scored the first goal of the derby match with a bicycle kick against Galatasaray. He continued his good run of form by scoring a late equaliser against Kayserispor to earn a draw for his team in quarter-finals of the Turkish Cup on 12 April 2012, helping his team to reach the semi-finals through a penalty shoot-out. Sow also scored the second goal for his team against rivals Trabzonspor on 15 April 2012. Over the course of the 2011–12 season Sow played 12 league matches and scored 7 goals. Sow earned his first trophy with Fener in the Turkish Cup final on 16 May as the club ripped apart Bursaspor by a score of 4–0.

In the 2012–13 season Sow scored 13 goals in 22 league matches and three goals in European matches. On 3 March 2013, he scored twice against Beşiktaş followed by a goal each in the following league matches, a 4–1 victory against Bursaspor and a 2–1 win against. Antalyaspor. On 22 May 2013, he scored the solitary goal as Fenerbahçe defeated Trabzonspor to secure the club's second straight 2012–13 Turkish Cup, consolation for falling short to city rivals Galatasaray in the league campaign. On 21 September 2013, Fenerbahçe were victorious in a 4–0 win against Elazığspor while Sow completed his first hat-trick for the club during this match. Sow cried after leaving Fenerbahçe and stated that he will forever be only a Fenerbahçe fan.

Al Ahli
On 29 August 2015, Al Ahli acquired Sow for €16 million.

Return to Fenerbahçe on loan
On 31 August 2016, Sow wanted to return to Fenerbahçe and returned to Fenerbahçe on a season long loan deal from Al Ahli. In November 2016, Fenerbahçe began selling shirts with Sow's name and number turned upside as tribute to his repeated times of his amazing bicycle kick goals, the latter of whom he scored a hat-trick against. On 8 December 2016, Sow scored another bicycle kick, this time in the UEFA Europa League in a 1–0 away victory against Feyenoord.

Loan to Bursaspor
In January 2018, Sow joined Bursaspor on loan from Al Ahli until the end of 2017–18 season.

Gazişehir Gaziantep
On 28 January 2019, Sow signed for Gazişehir Gaziantep on a one-and-a-half-year contract.

International career
On 5 September 2010, Sow scored his first goal for Senegal in a 4–0 defeat of the Democratic Republic of Congo during qualifying for the 2012 Africa Cup of Nations. He scored three more times in the qualifying phase as well as once in a 2–1 defeat to Equatorial Guinea at the tournament finals.

At the 2015 Africa Cup of Nations, Sow scored Senegal's winning goal as they defeated Ghana 2–1 in the team's opening match.

In May 2018 he was named in Senegal's 23-man squad for the 2018 FIFA World Cup in Russia.

He retired from international football in August 2018.

Career statistics

Club

International

Scores and results list Senegal's goal tally first, score column indicates score after each Sow goal. (includes two unofficial goals)

Honours
Lille
 Ligue 1: 2010–11
 Coupe de France: 2010–11

Fenerbahce
Süper Lig: 2013–14
Türkiye Kupası: 2011–12, 2012–13
Süper Kupa: 2014

Al-Ahli Dubai
 UAE Pro-League: 2015–16

France U19
UEFA European Under-19 Football Championship: 2005

Individual
CAF Team of the Year: 2011
 Ligue 1 top goalscorer: 2010–11
 Ligue 1 Team of the Season: 2010–11

References

External links

1986 births
Living people
Footballers from Yvelines
People from Mantes-la-Jolie
Senegalese footballers
Senegal international footballers
French footballers
France youth international footballers
France under-21 international footballers
French sportspeople of Senegalese descent
Stade Rennais F.C. players
CS Sedan Ardennes players
Amiens SC players
Lille OSC players
Fenerbahçe S.K. footballers
Al Ahli Club (Dubai) players
Shabab Al-Ahli Club players
Bursaspor footballers
Ümraniyespor footballers
Ligue 1 players
Ligue 2 players
Süper Lig players
UAE Pro League players
INF Clairefontaine players
Association football forwards
2012 Africa Cup of Nations players
Senegalese expatriate footballers
French expatriate footballers
Expatriate footballers in Turkey
Expatriate footballers in the United Arab Emirates
2015 Africa Cup of Nations players
2017 Africa Cup of Nations players
2018 FIFA World Cup players